, is one of the Satsunan Islands, usually classed with the Ōsumi Islands belonging to Kagoshima Prefecture, Japan. The island, 4.2 km² in area, has a population of 78 persons. The island can only be reached by ferry service to the city of Kagoshima on the mainland, as there is no airport. Travel time is about 3 hours. The islanders are dependent mainly on fishing, agriculture and seasonal tourism.

Geography
The island is of volcanic origin, being adjacent to the northern rim of the Kikai Caldera and predating the Akahoya eruption. Most of the coastline has steep cliffs.

Its climate is classified as subtropical, with a rainy season from May through September. The island is heavily forested with stands of Ryukyu bamboo.

History
Jōmon-period remains have been found on Takeshima, indicating continuous occupation for at least the past 3000 years. Per local folklore, the island was one of the havens of the defeated Heike clan after they lost the Genpei War against the Minamoto clan. This is reflected in many local customs, and the remains of late Heian period and early Kamakura period fortifications. During the Edo period, Takeshima was part of Satsuma Domain and was administered as part of Kawabe District. In 1896, the island was transferred to the administrative control of Ōshima District, Kagoshima, and from 1911 was part of the village of Toshima, Kagoshima. From 1946 to 1952, the southern seven islands in the group forming the Tokara archipelago came under the administration of the United States as part of the Provisional Government of Northern Ryukyu Islands; however, since Takeshima is located north of 30 degrees North, it remained Japanese territory during this time, and came under the administration of the village of Mishima, Kagoshima Prefecture.

External links
 Official home page

Ōsumi Islands
Islands of Kagoshima Prefecture